Ángel Yesid Torres Quiñones (born 6 April 2000) is a Colombian professional footballer who plays for Balzan as a winger.

Career statistics

Club

References

2000 births
Living people
Footballers from Bogotá
Colombian footballers
Association football midfielders
FC Porto players
FC Porto B players
Liga Portugal 2 players